Erysimum nervosum (syn: Erysimum grandiflorum Desf. var. nervosum (Pomel) Batt.) is a short-lived, polycarpic perennial herb.

It is found in many montane regions of North Africa, including the Rif Mountains and Atlas Mountains in Morocco, the Tell Atlas in Algeria and the Ghar-Rouban mountains in Algeria and Tunisia.

Erysimum nervosum is distributed between 1000 and 3000 meters above sea level and inhabits forests, scrublands, and shrublands.

References

nervosum
Flora of North Africa
Flora of Morocco
Flora of Algeria
Flora of Tunisia